Manisha Anuragi (Hindi: मनीषा अनुरागी) is an Indian politician and current Member of the legislative assembly, belonging to the Bharatiya Janata Party and representing the Rath constituency of Uttar Pradesh. In 2012, she won the election of Rath as independent candidate. Anuragi belongs to Koli caste of Uttar Pradesh.

Early life 
Manisha is a graduate of Bundelkhand University. She obtained an M.Phil. degree after completing her M.Sc., and she planned to become a professor after gaining a Ph.D. While preparing for it in 2010, she got married at the behest of her family to Dr Lekhram Anuragi. Lekhram is posted as a Ranger in the Forest Department and has a Ph.D. Manisha also planned to get the same degree, but Lekhram advised her to enter politics instead.

References 

1981 births
Living people
Koli people
Bharatiya Janata Party politicians from Uttar Pradesh
Uttar Pradesh MLAs 2017–2022
Uttar Pradesh MLAs 2022–2027